John Hilliard Carnegie (May 24, 1865 – April 10, 1937) was a Canadian farmer and political figure. He represented Victoria East in the Legislative Assembly of Ontario as a Conservative member from 1894 to 1909.

He was born in Peterborough in 1865, the son of John Carnegie, and educated there, at the Guelph Agricultural College and in Edinburgh. He served as auditor for Bexley Township and was also a member of the township council. Carnegie retired from politics in 1909. He died in 1937.

References

External links 
The Canadian parliamentary companion, 1897 JA Gemmill

1865 births
1937 deaths
Progressive Conservative Party of Ontario MPPs